The 2015 season was St. Patrick's Athletic F.C.'s 86th year in existence and was the Supersaint's 64th consecutive season in the top-flight of Irish football. It was the fourth year that Liam Buckley was the team's manager (in his current spell), following replacing Pete Mahon in December 2011. The Saints aimed to retain their FAI Cup, President's Cup and Leinster Senior Cup titles that were won during the 2014 season. Pats also competed in the UEFA Europa League and the EA Sports Cup. The 2015 League of Ireland fixtures were released on 16 December 2014, with the Saints' first game being an away fixture against South Dublin rivals Shamrock Rovers on 6 March 2015. The season turned out to be a very disappointing one for players, management and fans alike as the Saints finished of way off the top of the league, only securing European football on the final day, were knocked out of the FAI Cup at the early stages and failed to get past the first hurdle in the Europa League. However they did win the 2015 League of Ireland Cup on penalties versus Galway United on 19 September 2015, completing the set of trophies for manager Liam Buckley, meaning he has won every trophy possible to win with the Saints in the last three seasons. During the season, the team also set a club record winning streak in the league that stretched 9 games, beating the previous record of 8.

Squad

Transfers

Preseason

In

Out

Mid-season

In

Out

Squad statistics

Appearances, goals and cards
Number in brackets represents (appearances of which were substituted ON).
Last Updated – 8 November 2015

Top scorers
Includes all competitive matches.
Last updated 8 November 2015

Top Clean Sheets
Includes all competitive matches.
Last updated 8 November 2015

Disciplinary record

Captains

Club

Technical Staff
Manager: Liam Buckley
Assistant manager: Richie Smith
Head Of Player Recruitment / Coach: Dave Campbell
Coach: Darius Kierans
Coach: Alan Reynolds
Goalkeeping coach: Pat Jennings
Strength and Conditioning Coach: Paul Stewart
Video Analyst: Jason Donohue
Coaches Assistant: Graeme Buckley
Chartered Physiotherapist: Fionn Daly
Physiotherapist: Christy O'Neill
Club Doctor: Dr Matt Corcoran
Kit Man: Derek Haines
Equipment Manager: Gerry Molloy
Under 19's Management: Cyril Walsh & Richie Smith (2014–15), Gareth Dodrill (2015)

Kit

|
|
|
|
|
|
|}

The club's Home kit was retained from the 2014 season, with the 2014 Away kit becoming the Third kit for 2015 and a new Away kit released for the season.

Key:
LOI=League of Ireland
FAI=FAI Cup
EAC= EA Sports Cup
UEL=Europa League
LSC=Leinster Senior Cup
PRC=President's Cup
FRN=Friendly

Televised Matches

Competitions

League of Ireland

The 2015 League of Ireland fixtures were announced on 16 December 2014. St Patrick's Athletic were revealed to have a Dublin Derby against Shamrock Rovers away from home on the first day of the season. The Saints' first home fixture would be against Bray Wanderers on the second day of the season.

League table

Results summary

Results by round

Matches

FAI Cup

Second round

Third round

EA Sports Cup

Second round

Quarter-final

Semi-final

Final

Europa League

First qualifying round

First leg

Second leg

Leinster Senior Cup

Fourth round

Quarter-final

Semi-final

President's Cup

Final

Friendlies

Preseason

Mid-season

References

St Patrick's Athletic F.C. seasons
St